Dustin Kalthoff is a Canadian curler from Humboldt, Saskatchewan.

Teams

Men's

Mixed doubles

Personal life
Kalthoff graduated from University of Saskatchewan. He currently lives in Saskatoon.

He is founder and General Manager at Saskatoon Auto Connection in Saskatoon. 

Kalthoff's father Kevin is a three-time Saskatchewan men's champion.

References

External links

 Dustin Kalthoff - Saskatoon Auto Connection - Reviewsii.com
 
 
 
 Video: 
 
 

Living people
1980s births
Sportspeople from Humboldt, Saskatchewan
Canadian male curlers
Curlers from Saskatoon
University of Saskatchewan alumni